Blow is a Foetus remix album, released on September 18, 2001, through Thirsty Ear. European label nois-o-lution issued a 2LP version in November of the same year. Blow contains remixes from Foetus' Flow.

Track listing

Personnel 
Drew Anderson – mastering
Steve Schwartz – art direction
J. G. Thirlwell (as Foetus) – vocals, production, illustrations

References

External links 
 
 Blow at foetus.org

2001 remix albums
Foetus (band) albums
Thirsty Ear Recordings remix albums